Sylvia Anne Edwards (30 January 1937 – 25 October 2018) was an American abstract artist. Edwards held her first commercial exhibition in 1975, and had over thirty solo exhibitions in the US, Europe, the Middle East, and North Africa during her lifetime.

Biography 
Sylvia Edwards was born in Boston, Massachusetts to Sylvia (née Mailloux) and Junius Edwards. Her father was a music impresario. In the 1940s, he hired big bands such as Harry James, Duke Ellington, and Tommy Dorsey, and founded a magazine, Ballroom and Orchestra, a forerunner for DownBeat. Edwards' mother encouraged her to draw images of the world around her and instilled in her a love of color. Edwards spent summers in a country house in Uxbridge, Massachusetts.

During high school, she attended special classes for artistically gifted students and was accepted at Massachusetts College of Art, which she attended from 1954 to 1957. Her interest in abstract art was sparked by Lawrence Kupferman, a modernist painter who introduced his students to the work of Georges Braque and Piet Mondrian and the dynamics of cityscapes. 

She left college to marry an Iranian student, Sadredin Golestaneh, who was studying to become an electronic engineer. Their first daughter, Shirin, was born in 1958. They then moved to Philadelphia, where their second child, Nader, was born in 1960. In 1961, the family moved to Tehran, Iran.

Edwards spent fourteen years living in Iran, which had a profound influence on her artistic and personal development. She studied Iran's history, the impact it had on other civilizations, and its arts and crafts. She also learned about the people and their views of life, and the Iranian appreciation of beauty left an impact on her. 

Her third child, Leila, was born in 1966 in Southern Iran. Edwards' husband encouraged the building of a studio for her on the lower level of their house, and she began to rediscover her artistic passion.

Edwards moved to Switzerland in 1975, before settling in London in 1977. She summered and painted in her studio on Cape Cod, Massachusetts. She resided in England until her death in 2018.

Solo exhibitions 
 London, England, Grosvenor Gallery, 2003
 London, England, The Chelsea Arts Club, 2000
 Boca Grande, Florida, The Galleria, 2000
 Falmouth, Massachusetts, Gallery Szent Gyorgi, 1998
 Boca Grande, Florida, The Galleria, 1998
 Oxford, England, CCA Gallery, 1996
 Provincetown, Massachusetts, Sola Gallery, 1993
 Vero Beach, Florida, Munson Gallery, 1992
 Braunschweig, Germany, Jaeshke Gallery, 1991
 Chatham, Massachusetts, Munson Gallery, 1991
 Johannesburg, South Africa, Natalie Knight Gallery, 1991
 Tokyo, Japan, Bankamura, 1991
 Tokyo, Japan, Gallery K. Hyazaki Prefecture, 1991
 Tokyo, Japan, Mitsukoshi Mihonbashi Branch, 1991
 London, England, Berkley Square Gallery, 1991
 Tokyo, Japan, Sony Plaza, 1991
 Sarasota, Florida, The Salon Gallery, 1990
 London, England, CCA Gallery, 1990
 Singapore, Art Base Gallery, 1989
 Tokyo, Japan, CCA Gallery, 1989
 Osaka, Japan, The Nii Gallery, 1989
 London, England, The Berkeley Square Gallery, 1988
 Guernsey, Channel Isles, Coach House Gallery, 1986
 London, England, Christopher Hull Gallery, 1985
 London, England, Hamiltons Gallery, 1982
 Chapel Hill, North Carolina, Morehead Planetarium (UNC), 1982
 Boston, Massachusetts, Parkman House, 1982
 Boston, Massachusetts, Boston City Hall, 1981
 London, England, Hamiltons Gallery, 1980
 Alexandria, Egypt, Museum of Fine Arts, 1980
 Martha's Vineyard, Massachusetts, Old Sculpin Gallery, 1979
 London, England, Belgrave Gallery, 1978
 Geneva, Switzerland, CERN, 1977
 Rolle, Switzerland, CH Gallery, 1976
 Tehran, Iran, Iran American Society, 1975

Public collections 
 Tate Britain, London, United Kingdom
 Cape Museum of Fine Arts (Cape Cod), Dennis, Massachusetts
 Museum of Fine Arts, Alexandria, Egypt
 London Lighthouse, London, United Kingdom
 Midwest Museum of American Art, Elkhart, Indiana

Selected criticism 
Infinite Softness
 "The works of Sylvia Edwards Golestaneh have an affinity with Japanese wood-cuts and the artist has brought to realization the innate character and possibilities of watercolour: flow of colours and lines in space, poetry of shapes and themes.
 This gentleness seems to touch the world and transform it, even perpetuate it in the calm pastel hues and the satisfying and warm pulse of tints which remain pure and fresh when merged, especially when they embark on a dialogue of an intimate nature.
 One sees elegant vases shooting forth delicate, flowering branches, villages and traditional structures, flowering spring landscapes or those of winter covered with their silent layer of snow.
 In this calm painting the figurative becomes 'tachist' or even 'cubist' but always indistinct, nebulous, gently stirring.
 These gentle country themes take, on occasion, directions where one may conjure up some sort of hidden frivolity, secret and introspective which introduces into this charming atmosphere of sincerity, several passionate touches which are the subtle spice of peace and serenity."

Jacques SIMON: Journal de Téhéran, April 1975

 "Her flower paintings glow as if with inner light—taking on the living vibrancies"

Mel Gooding: Arts Review, 1988

 "Each time Edwards gives her kaleidoscopic mind a shake, we get a splendidly lush yet pictorially ordered glimpse of chaos. Nothing in these paintings is encoded in a private language... Rather they are unaffected celebrations of the world in its upbeat mode."

Robin Duthy, 1988

References

External links 
 Official Website

1937 births
2018 deaths
American abstract artists
Massachusetts College of Art and Design alumni
People from Boston